T. domestica may refer to:
 Tegenaria domestica, the barn funnel weaver spider, lesser house spider or common house spider, a spider species
 Thermobia domestica, the firebrat, a small insect species

See also
 Domestica (disambiguation)